Heaven is the fourth studio album by the Cincinnati indie rock group Pomegranates, released June 5, 2012, on Modern Outsider Records. It was produced by Miguel Urbitztondo who has worked with acts such as Cracker, Daniel Johnston, and Sparklehorse. The album follows their critically acclaimed One of Us in 2010.

Track listing
All songs written by Pomegranates

Personnel
Pomegranates
Joey Cook – Bass, Guitar, Keyboards, Percussion, Vocals
Isaac Karns – Bass, Guitar, Keyboards, Sampling, Vocals
Jacob Merritt – Drums & Percussion
Curt Kiser – Bass, Guitar, Vocals

References

2012 albums